Alon Netzer (born 2 June 1993) is an Israeli footballer who plays as a defender. His grandparents from his father side were born in Romania, but moved to Israel in 1948, because of that he holds Romanian citizenship. In 2016 he went with fellow Israeli player, Yuval Jakobovich to play in Romania for Liga I club ASA Târgu Mureș.

References

1993 births
Living people
Israeli footballers
Hapoel Nir Ramat HaSharon F.C. players
ASA 2013 Târgu Mureș players
Derry City F.C. players
FK Riteriai players
Hapoel Nof HaGalil F.C. players
LPS HD Clinceni players
Israeli Premier League players
Liga Leumit players
Liga I players
A Lyga players
Israeli expatriate footballers
Expatriate footballers in Romania
Expatriate association footballers in Ireland
Expatriate footballers in Lithuania
Israeli expatriate sportspeople in Romania
Israeli expatriate sportspeople in Ireland
Israeli expatriate sportspeople in Lithuania
Footballers from Herzliya
Israeli people of Romanian-Jewish descent
Association football defenders